The Russell Brand Show was a radio show first broadcast in 2006 on BBC Radio 6 Music and later on BBC Radio 2, TalkSport, XFM and finally Radio X in 2017. The show's host was English comedian Russell Brand, who was usually joined by co-host and long-term friend Matt Morgan, as well as the show's poet laureate, Greg "Mr Gee" Sekweyama. The show also featured regular contributions from English musician Noel Gallagher, who was described as an unofficial co-host.

The Russell Brand Show was originally broadcast from 2006 to 2007 on BBC Radio 6 Music on Sundays from 10 am to 1 pm. After gaining popularity, the show moved to BBC Radio 2 in 2007, retitled Russell Brand and broadcast on Saturdays from 9 pm to 11 pm. In October 2008, Brand resigned from the BBC after a prank call on the show with comedian Jonathan Ross to Andrew Sachs resulted in over 30,000 complaints and a £150,000 fine to the BBC, ending the shows run on the BBC and effectively sending the show into a hiatus. In October 2010, nearly two years since Brand's resignation from the BBC, the renamed The Russell Brand Radio Show returned for a few weeks on Talksport, featuring Brand, Morgan and Mr Gee.

History

BBC Radio 6 Music
In December 2005, Brand filled in for Nemone with co-presenter Karl Pilkington for three radio shows on BBC Radio 6 Music. In April 2006, Brand was given a regular Sunday-morning 10am to 1pm slot on the station. Pilkington was advertised as being his co-host and appeared with him on the first show, but thereafter Brand's long-term contributor Matt Morgan and comedian Trevor Lock (who left in March 2007 to start his own radio show) filled the role. Brand's 6Music radio show was ranked as high as number 2 in the iTunes most-subscribed-podcast chart.

The BBC Radio 6 Music shows would usually take on a different theme each week. For instance, one week the theme was "What Have I Done To Deserve This?" Lock would tell stories of being caught accidentally drowning a rodent by a vicar, while on the "Lies" themed show Brand would talk about pouring Jif round his bathroom and telling his mother it had come out when trying to urinate. The trio would regularly tease one another about these absurd and hilarious anecdotes. There would be an almost weekly item where Brand would read out a made-up story from the tabloids about his private life. A constant source of fascination and frustration was "Trevor's Sonic Enigma", which was later renamed "Trevor Done A Noise" by Brand and Morgan. This was meant to be a short clip of sound effects and voices (all done by Lock) meant to suggest the title of a song. These enigmas were notable for being misleading and confusing as well as very long, winners were invited to join the presenters in the studio the next week. The other item was "Challenge Trevor" in which Lock was set a list of undesirable challenges by the listeners. These went from eating lemons to serenading Noel Gallagher with an Oasis song in Lock's Elvis Presley voice.

BBC Radio 2

The show was transferred to BBC Radio 2, the UK's most popular radio station, from Saturday 18 November 2006 in the 9pm11pm timeslot. The Radio 2 controller at the time, Lesley Douglas, who was also the controller of 6Music, said  "Russell established himself as a genuine radio talent on 6 Music and has done a brilliant job there. Radio 2 gives him a fresh challenge, and a new audience. He proved a hit with Radio 2 listeners when he stood in for Mark Radcliffe earlier this year".

In October 2006, BBC announced a 40% rise in listeners to BBC digital radio, which they claimed was largely attributed to Brand and his show. According to industry ratings body RAJAR, the station was attracting over 400,000 listeners. Because of Brand's work in movies and stand-up, the show had to be broadcast from locations away from the radio station. It was recorded in Hawaii for 3 months in 2007 while Brand was filming Forgetting Sarah Marshall and from Los Angeles on several occasions in 2008, with Matt and Mr. Gee remaining in London. In May 2008 Matt joined Russell in L.A. in order to pursue opportunities within the film industry, in particular with writing. When Brand was on holiday, the BBC sometimes aired a "best bits" programme and sometimes had an alternative show with another presenter, usually Lauren Laverne. In the absence of Matt Morgan during the last few weeks of the show in September–October 2008, the following acted as guest presenters alongside Brand: Simon Amstell, Noel Gallagher, Alan Carr, David Baddiel and Jonathan Ross. On 31 May 2008 show, Brand announced that the programme was now produced by Vanity Projects, the production company that he owns and has been part of with many of his previous TV shows.

Due to The Russell Brand Show prank calls row, Brand resigned from the show on 29 October 2008, and released the following statement:

Lesley Douglas, who had brought Brand to BBC Radio 2, resigned as a result of the controversy saying, "The events of the last two weeks happened on my watch. I believe it is right that I take responsibility for what has happened."

talkSPORT
After hosting a one off football show with Noel Gallagher Brand returned to Talksport on 9 October 2010, with a Saturday night show that lasted 20 weeks. The show featured clips and back-stage recordings from his Booky Wook 2 promotional tour. Brand was joined by a host of guests, including Noel Gallagher and Jonathan Ross.

XFM
On 18 March 2013, Brand returned to radio on Xfm with his old co-host, Matt Morgan, for a one-off special in aid of the Teenage Cancer Trust. They were joined by Noel Gallagher, Noel Fielding and Mr Gee with Trevor Lock and David Icke phoning in as guests.

Radio X
Brand announced on 30 March 2017 edition of The Chris Moyles Show he would return to radio, beginning on 2 April 2017 he began hosting the 11am1pm slot on Sunday with Matt Morgan and Mr Gee. However, from January 2018 the show was put on semi-permanent hiatus as Brand concentrated on other work. Its slot was initially replaced by Danny Wallace's Important Broadcast. On "The Matt Morgan Podcast" in 2020, Matt Morgan and Mr Gee discussed the shows hiatus from Radio X being down to Russell "not wanting to continue" the show any longer.

Show format
The radio show often features a phone call to, or appearance by, Noel Gallagher of Oasis. Other celebrities are also frequently featured, and there is discussions revolving around listeners' emails, text messages or phone calls. The music on the show was decided by the hosts and because of Brand's admiration for him, songs by Morrissey or The Smiths were often played.

Features
"Jingle race war" – Listeners sent in their home-made jingles for features. A "race war" was chosen as the BBC suspended phone-in competitions contests after phone-in scandals.
"Gay!" – Listeners wrote or phoned in with gay-related problems or issues for the hosts or guests to solve.
"Matt's Cultural Review" – Matt reviewed some aspects of culture, including restaurants, theatre shows and cities.
"Nanecdote" – Listeners sent in humorous anecdotes about Nans.
"News Stories" – Brand and Morgan discussed bizarre news stories, e.g. breast-milk food products.
"Sounds nice, Is nasty" – Listeners sent in words that sound pleasant but are not nice things.
"Sounds nasty, Is nice" – Opposite of Sounds nice, Is nasty. Listeners sent in words that sound horrible, but are actually nice things.
"Mr. Gee's poem" – Each show was concluded by a poem by Mr. Gee, the poet laureate of the show, which summed up what has happened each week.
"Cry for Help" – Consisted of listeners phoning and asking Brand and Morgan for advice.
"Tramps That Look Like Matt" – Listeners sent in pictures of tramps that looked like Morgan.
"Trevor's Sonic Enigma" – A regular feature on the BBC 6 Music show, Trevor Lock played out a short soundscape which alluded to the title of a popular song. Listeners to the show then had to guess what this song was, and winning entrants would be invited to the studio the following week. In its early days, this feature was known as "Trevor Done a Noise".

Guests
Brand had a wide array of celebrity guests either in the studio or over the phone on his show. Notable appearances include Morrissey, Ronnie Wood, Kristen Bell, Jonah Hill, Ricky Gervais, Stephen Merchant, Slash, Matt Lucas, David Walliams, James Corden, Barbara Windsor, David Mitchell, Noel Fielding, Courtney Love, Lily Allen, Victoria Wood, Jon Ronson, David Icke, Steven Seagal, Will Self, Chrissie Hynde, Katy Perry, Dale Winton, Jonny Lee Miller, Seth Rogen, Cilla Black, Guy Pearce, Henry Winkler, Richard Griffiths, Richard Dawkins, Steven Pinker, Adam Green, Alan Carr, Bill Hader, Jonathan Ross, Jimmy Savile, Oliver Postgate and the voice of Zippy.

Controversies

Faked competitions
In March 2008 the show was exposed for faking a competition in April 2006 when the show was broadcasting on BBC Radio 6 Music. The show was broadcast on 9 April 2006 in which listeners were invited to take part in a competition via text message. The show gave the impression that it was broadcasting live but it was actually a pre-recorded show. There was an apology issued the following show to explain the mistake to fans. BBC 6 Music later gave an apology and offered listeners who entered the competition compensation for the cost of the text message.

Prank calls row

In a show recorded on 16 October 2008 and broadcast two days later, Brand made several phone calls, along with guest Jonathan Ross, to actor Andrew Sachs' home, stating that he had had sexual relations with his granddaughter Georgina Baillie, along with further apparently lewd suggestions. Sachs was apparently "deeply upset" by the calls, and denied having given permission for them to be broadcast. Brand and the BBC later apologised for the incident. Both Brand and Ross were suspended by the BBC pending an investigation The broadcast regulator Ofcom announced they would also be conducting an investigation. The BBC originally only received a few complaints but after the involvement of the tabloids the BBC received 30,500 complaints by Thursday morning, 30 October 2008.

Podcast
When the show was broadcast on BBC Radio 6 Music, Brand's show was downloaded 140,000 times in September 2006, the only programme from a digital station to appear in the BBC's top 10 podcasts.

In January 2007, the show reached the number one spot on the iTunes podcast charts and held that position until April 2007 when it was overtaken by The Apprentice podcast and continued to go up and down the charts prompting Brand to start a campaign to get it back to number 1 by promising that he and Morgan would rent an ice cream van and travel the country giving out free ice cream. This eventually succeeded, and on 1 September 2007, the show was broadcast live from an ice cream van on Blackpool promenade. The podcast regularly topped the charts and whenever it slumped Brand reminded listeners to continue to download the programme and increase its standing.

After the public outcry regarding the Andrew Sachs controversy, the 18 October broadcast was removed from iTunes. At the time of Brand's resignation, the podcast was at number one on the iTunes UK podcast charts. Parts of this radio show are available to buy on a CD called "Russell Brand – The Best Of What's Legal". But all the podcasts in their entirety are available to download on media-sharing sites.

Videos
"Viddycasts" began on 14 June 2008 show and consist of footage filmed before, during and after the show. Since Radio 2 launched their new-styled website, the Viddycasts are no longer available from the BBC.  Instead they can be seen on YouTube.

Awards

See also
The Russell Brand Show (TV series)

References

External links
The Russell Brand Show at talkSPORT
Russell Brand RSS feed at talkSPORT

Audio podcasts
BBC Radio comedy programmes
BBC Radio 2 programmes
BBC Radio 6 Music programmes
Russell Brand